Troy Evans is the name of:

 Troy Evans (actor) (born 1948), American actor
 Troy Evans (American football) (born 1977), American football linebacker